Stories Without Words is the eleventh album by American jazz fusion band Spyro Gyra, released in 1987. At Billboard magazine, it reached No. 84 on the Top 200 Albums chart and No. 67 on the R&B Albums chart.

Track listing 
 "Cayo Hueso" (Jay Beckenstein) – 5:29
 "Serpentine Shelly" (Tom Schuman) – 4:33
 "Del Corazon" (Julio Fernandez) – 6:25
 "Early Light" (Beckenstein) – 4:23
 "Nu Sungo" (Manolo Badrena) – 4:10
 "Chrysalis" (Dave Samuels) – 4:12
 "Joy Ride" (Jeremy Wall) – 4:55
 "Pyramid" (Wall) – 6:25

Personnel 
 Jay Beckenstein – saxophones, Lyricon
 Tom Schuman – keyboards
 Julio Fernández – guitars
 Roberto Vally – bass, vocals
 Richie Morales – drums
 Manolo Badrena – percussion
  Dave Samuels – marimba, vibraphone

Production 
 Jay Beckenstein – producer 
 Jeremy Wall – assistant producer
 Larry Swist – engineer
 Chris Bubacz – assistant engineer 
 Doug Rose – assistant engineer
 Doug Oberkircher – technical assistance 
 Bob Ludwig – mastering at Masterdisk (New York, NY).
 Kathleen Covert – art direction, design
 Ted Glazer – front cover illustration 
 Timothy White – back cover photography

References

1987 albums
Spyro Gyra albums
MCA Records albums